Lincoln County is one of the 141 Cadastral divisions of New South Wales. It contains Dubbo.

Lincoln County was named in honour of Henry Fiennes Pelham Clinton, 5th Duke of Newcastle (1811-1864), styled Earl of Lincoln.

Parishes within this county
A full list of parishes found within this county; their current LGA and mapping coordinates to the approximate centre of each location is as follows:

See also 
 List of reduplicated Australian place names

References 

 
Counties of New South Wales